Jadder Dantas (born 6 December 1982 ), is a Brazilian born, Azerbaijani futsal player who plays for Araz Naxçivan and the Azerbaijan national futsal team.

References

1982 births
Living people
Azerbaijani men's futsal players
Brazilian emigrants to Azerbaijan
Araz Naxçivan players